was a bureaucrat and cabinet minister in early Shōwa period Japan.

Biography
Yuzawa was born in Kamitsuga District, Tochigi in what is now part of the city of Kanuma as the son of a kannushi (Shinto priest)]. After his graduation in 1912 from Tokyo Imperial University he entered the Home Ministry. He served within the ministry within the field of public health, and oversaw the establishment of the Meiji Shrine Games, which were held annually from 1924 to 1943. In 1929, he was appointed Governor of Miyagi Prefecture. In 1931 he became Director of the Public Works Bureau, and Governor of Hiroshima Prefecture. In 1935, he was appointed Governor of Hyōgo Prefecture. In 1936, Yuzawa was appointed Vice Minister of the Home Ministry. In 1938, under the Hirota Kōki administration, Yuzawa was dispatched to China, to assist in the establishment of the Provisional Government of the Republic of China. While working closely with the Japanese Northern China Area Army, he established close connections with its chief-of-staff, General Akira Mutō. In 1940, he was appointed chairman of the Dai-Nippon Sangyō Jōhōkokukai, a war-time umbrella organization encompassing all of the former labor unions, which were now under government control.

On February 7, 1942, Yuzawa was appointed Home Minister in the Tōjō administration. Tōjō had originally insisted on holding the post concurrently with that of Prime Minister during the first months of World War II, fearing that the powerful security apparatus controlled by the Home Ministry could pose a threat to his administration should the war situation deteriorate. As Home Minister, Yuzawa organized government support for the Taisei Yokusankai, which won a landslide victory in the 1942 General Election, but had to contend with the increasing radicalization of the paramilitary youth wing of the party, the Yokusan Sonendan.  He also oversaw the creation of Tokyo Metropolis by the merger of Tokyo City with Tokyo-fu in 1942.

From April 1943 until the end of World War II, Yuzawa was appointed to a seat in the House of Peers.
After the surrender of Japan, Yuzawa was (along with all other members of the wartime government), purged by orders of the American occupation authorities. He subsequently served as honorary chairman of the Central Social Insurance Medical Council. In 1959, he ran for a seat in the post-war upper house of the Diet of Japan under the Liberal Party ticket and served for a single term. He died in 1963.

References
 
 Hunter, Janet.  A Concise Dictionary of Modern Japanese History . University of California Press (1994).

Notes

1888 births
1963 deaths
Politicians from Tochigi Prefecture
University of Tokyo alumni
Government ministers of Japan
Ministers of Home Affairs of Japan
Members of the House of Peers (Japan)
Liberal Party (Japan, 1945) politicians
Members of the House of Councillors (Japan)
Governors of Miyagi Prefecture
Governors of Hiroshima
Governors of Hyōgo Prefecture
Japanese fascists